The 2018 FFA Cup was the fifth season of the FFA Cup, the main national soccer knockout cup competition in Australia. 32 teams contested the competition proper (from the round of 32), including the 10 A-League teams and 21 Football Federation Australia (FFA) member federation teams determined through individual state qualifying rounds, as well as the reigning National Premier Leagues Champion (Heidelberg United from Victoria).

Round and dates

For the first time in the competition's history, the decision on the final venue will be conducted by a draw.

Teams 
A total of 32 teams participated in the 2018 FFA Cup competition proper, ten of which were from the A-League, one the 2017 National Premier Leagues Champion (Heidelberg United), and the remaining 21 teams from FFA member federations, as determined by the qualifying rounds. A-League clubs represent the highest level in the Australian league system, whereas member federation clubs come from Level 2 and below. The current season tier of member federation clubs is shown in parentheses.

Prize fund
The prize fund was unchanged from the previous two years' events.

In addition, a further $2,500 was awarded from sponsor NAB to Member Federation clubs for each goal scored by them against an A-League opposition. Clubs to receive these prizes were APIA Leichhardt Tigers ($7,500), Hellenic Athletic ($7,500), Avondale FC ($5,000), Rockdale City ($5,000), Bentleigh Greens ($2,500), Bonnyrigg White Eagles ($2,500) and Cairns FC ($2,500).

Preliminary rounds

FFA member federations teams competed in various state-based preliminary rounds to win one of 21 places in the competition proper (round of 32). All Australian clubs were eligible to enter the qualifying process through their respective FFA member federation, however only one team per club is permitted entry in the competition. All nine FFA member federations took part in the tournament.

The preliminary rounds will operate within a consistent national structure whereby club entry into the competition is staggered in each state/territory, ultimately leading to round 7 with the winning clubs from that round gaining direct entry into the round of 32. The first matches of the preliminary rounds began in February 2018, and the final matches of the preliminary rounds in June 2018.

Bracket

Round of 32
The Round of 32 draw took place on 26 June 2018, with match information confirmed on 2 July.

The lowest ranked side that qualified for this round were Gold Coast Knights. They were the only level 4 team left in the competition.

All times listed below are at AEST

Round of 16
The Round of 16 draw took place on 7 August 2018, with match details finalised two days later. 

The lowest ranked sides that qualified for this round were Adelaide Comets, APIA Leichhardt Tigers, Avondale FC, Bentleigh Greens, Bonnyrigg White Eagles, Broadmeadow Magic, Cairns FC, Devonport City, Heidelberg United and Queensland Lions. They were the only level 2 teams left in the competition.

All times listed below are at AEST

Quarter-finals
The quarter-finals draw took place on 29 August 2018, with match details announced the following day.

The lowest ranked sides that qualified for this round were APIA Leichhardt Tigers, Avondale FC, Bentleigh Greens and Heidelberg United. They were the only level 2 teams left in the competition.

All times listed below are at AEST

Semi-finals
The semi-finals draw took place on 26 September 2018, with match details announced the next day.

The lowest ranked side that qualified for this round were Bentleigh Greens. They were the only level 2 team left in the competition.

All times listed below are at AEDT

Final

Individual honours
The Michael Cockerill Medal was introduced in 2018 to recognise the tournament's standout National Premier Leagues performer, named after the late former journalist and broadcaster Michael Cockerill who died in August 2017. The inaugural recipient of the award was Elvis Kamsoba from Avondale FC. Craig Goodwin from Adelaide United won the Mark Viduka Medal for the player of the match in the final.

Top goalscorers

Notes: 
 Goals scored in preliminary rounds not included.

Broadcasting rights
The live television rights for the competition were held by the subscription network Fox Sports. The matches were also broadcast online on the My Football Live app from the round of 16 onwards. In addition to live updates and crosses at concurrent matches, the following matches were broadcast live:

References

External links
 Official website

FFA Cup
2018 in Australian soccer
Australia Cup seasons